Benjamin Jacobs (born April 17, 1988) is a former American football coach and former linebacker who is the assistant special teams coach for the Washington Commanders of the National Football League (NFL). He was signed by the Cleveland Browns as an undrafted free agent in 2011. Jacobs played college football for Fresno State, where he tied an NCAA record by forcing three fumbles in a single game.

Career

Playing

Cleveland Browns
Jacobs signed with the Cleveland Browns as an undrafted free agent on July 30, 2011. He was released during final roster cuts and on September 5, 2011 was signed to the Browns' practice squad. He was promoted to the active roster on November 29, 2011. He played in five games as a rookie but didn't register any stats. In 2012, Jacobs was once again waived by the Browns during roster cuts and was signed to the practice squad. He was released by the Browns on October 9, 2012.

Cincinnati Bengals
Jacobs was signed to the Bengals practice squad on November 12, 2012 but was released on November 27, 2012.

Carolina Panthers
On May 13, 2013, Jacobs was signed by the Panthers. He was waived during final roster cuts on August 31, 2013 and was signed to the Panthers' practice squad. He was promoted to the active roster on October 5, 2013 but was released two days later and re-signed back to the practice squad, where he spent the rest of the season. In the 2014 season, Jacobs played in all 16 regular season games leading the team with nine special teams tackles and one on defense.

In the 2015 season, Jacobs played in 16 games recording seven tackles on defense and eight on special teams. He played in all three postseason games. On February 7, 2016, Jacobs was part of the Panthers team that played in Super Bowl 50. In the game, he recorded two special teams tackles, but the Panthers fell to the Denver Broncos by a score of 24–10.

On September 3, 2016, Jacobs was placed on injured reserve after suffering a quad injury in the preseason but was released the following day. He was re-signed by the team on December 9, 2016.

On February 8, 2017, Jacobs signed a two-year deal with the Panthers.

Statistics

Coaching
Having been a member of the Panthers for six seasons as a core special teamer, head coach Ron Rivera personally asked Jacobs if he would consider making the transition to coaching for the team, to which he agreed. Following Rivera's firing and subsequent hiring by the Washington Football Team in 2020, Jacobs joined their staff as the assistant special teams coach.

References

External links
Fresno State Bulldogs profile
Washington Commanders profile

1988 births
Living people
Sportspeople from the Las Vegas Valley
Players of American football from Nevada
American football linebackers
Fresno State Bulldogs football players
Cleveland Browns players
Carolina Panthers players
Carolina Panthers coaches
Cincinnati Bengals players
Washington Commanders coaches
Washington Football Team coaches